Sprengelia incarnata, commonly referred to as pink swamp-heath, is a species of flowering plant of the family Ericaceae, and is native to south-eastern Australia and New Zealand. It is an erect, glabrous shrub with sharply-pointed, stem-clasping, egg-shaped leaves, and clusters of pink, tube-shaped flowers with spreading lobes.

Description

The Tasmanian endemics Richea sprengelioides and R. procera are similar, but have leaf scars on the stems that are not present on the smooth stems of S. incarnata.

Taxonomy
Sprengelia incarnata was first formally described in 1794 by James Edward Smith in Kongliga Vetenskaps Academiens Nya Handlingar. The specific epithet (incarnata) means "flesh-coloured".

Habitat and distribution
Native to Australia and New Zealand, Sprengelia incarnata can be found growing in the wet swamps and heathlands in many of Australia’s south-eastern regions, and a select few areas of New Zealand. The species only occurs in the far south-east of South Australia, including on Kangaroo Island, in the southern half of Victoria, and on the coast and nearby tablelands of New South Wales south from Coffs Harbour. Pink swamp-heath is widespread and abundant in Tasmania, where is it found in almost all wet and peaty landscapes, ranging from sea level to the highest mountains. It is considered at high risk and naturally uncommon in New Zealand, where it is only found in the Fiordland National Park and on Resolution Island.

References

Epacridoideae
incarnata
Ericales of Australia
Flora of New South Wales
Flora of South Australia
Flora of Tasmania
Flora of Victoria (Australia)
Flora of New Zealand
Plants described in 1794
Taxa named by James Edward Smith